Stade Albert Domec is a multi-use municipal stadium in Carcassonne, France. It has a capacity of 10,000 spectators. It is the home ground of Pro D2 rugby union club Union Sportive Carcassonnaise and Elite One Championship rugby league club Association Sportive de Carcassonne XIII. It is also used by the association football club Football Agglomération Carcassonne for their big matches. Built in 1899, it is one of the oldest stadiums in France, and was renovated in 2002, and again in 2012 when US Carcassonne entered the Pro D2. The stadium is named after the French rugby union player Albert Domec, who died 20 September 1948, and who represented France in 1939. The stadium is also equipped for athletics and has an eight lane 400m track.

The stadium has been used in Rugby League World Cups. The ground has hosted many French rugby league championship and cup finals as well as French rugby league internationals, the first being in 1967 when Great Britain national rugby league team won 16–13 in front of 10,650 spectators

History 

Formerly called 'le stade de la Pepiniere' the ground was built and opened in 1899 and sits within the medieval castle walls of the city. In 1919 the rugby club paid 95,000 francs for the site then sold it to the local council a year later. The council built the two main stands that run along the length of the pitch each able to hold 3,000 spectators, floodlights and a cycle track were also installed. The stadium has been renovated twice since in 2002 and in 2012. The ground is named after the former US Carcassonne and French rugby union international player Albert Domec who played as a centre during the 1920s and 1930s. The stadium has a bronze statue of AS Carcassonne's most famous player, former captain of the French national rugby league team, Puig Aubert at its entrance. The record attendance at the ground is 23,500 for the French rugby league championship final in 1949 between AS Carcassonne and Marseille XIII.

International Rugby League Matches

Representative Rugby League Matches

French Rugby League Championship Finals (Elite 1)

Lord Derby Cup Finals

See also

List of rugby league stadiums by capacity
List of rugby union stadiums by capacity

References

External links

Rugby league stadiums in France
Rugby union stadiums in France
Rugby League World Cup stadiums
Athletics (track and field) venues in France
Sports venues in Aude
Sports venues completed in 1899